Georgios Karakostas (born 23 July 1984) is a Greek football player.

External links
 AEL 1964 FC Official
 Profile at Sportlarissa.gr

1984 births
Living people
Greek footballers
Association football defenders
Athlitiki Enosi Larissa F.C. players
Panetolikos F.C. players
PAS Giannina F.C. players
Anagennisi Arta F.C. players
Preveza F.C. players
Footballers from Amfilochia